Walter Gardiner, FLS, FRS (1 September 1859 – 31 August 1941) was a British botanist. He was educated at Bedford School and at Clare College, Cambridge, and was a Fellow there and Lecturer in Botany at the University. He was a Fellow of the Linnean Society of London, and was elected a Fellow of the Royal Society in 1890. He was awarded the Royal Society's Royal Medal in 1898: "For his researches on the protoplasmic connection of the cells of vegetable tissues and on the minute histology of plants."

References

External links
Entry for Gardiner in the Royal Society's Library and Archive catalogue's details of Fellows (accessed 23 April 2008)

1859 births
1941 deaths
British botanists
People educated at Bedford School
Alumni of Clare College, Cambridge
Fellows of Clare College, Cambridge
Fellows of the Royal Society
Fellows of the Linnean Society of London
Royal Medal winners
Place of birth missing